The men's 4 × 100 metre medley relay event at the 2018 Commonwealth Games as part of the swimming program took place on 10 April at the Gold Coast Aquatic Centre.

Records
Prior to this competition, the existing world and Commonwealth Games records were as follows.

The following records were established during the competition:

Results

Heats
The heats were held at 11:31.

Final
The final was held at 21:52.

References

Men's 4 x 100 metre medley relay
Commonwealth Games